UE Lleida is a semiprofessional association football club based in Lleida, Spain, which plays in Segunda División B. This chronological list comprises all those who have held the position of manager of the first team of UE Lleida from 1939 to the present day. Each manager's entry includes his dates of tenure and the club's overall competitive record (in terms of matches won, drawn and lost), honours won and significant achievements while under his care. Caretaker managers are included, where known.

The most successful UE Lleida manager in terms of trophies won is José Manuel Esnal Mané, who won one Segunda División title and one Segunda División B in his 6-year reign as manager. He is also the club's longest-serving manager. José María Cabo is Lleida's most successful permanent manager in terms of percentage of wins with 65.91%, while Miguel Rubio is team's least successful (13.04%). (20 games at last).

Emili Vicente is Lleida's current manager, replacing Javier Zubillaga, whose contract ended in June 2008.

Key
GF = Goals for
GA = Goals against
Win% = Percentage of win

List of managersInformation correct as of match played May 15th, 2011. Only competitive matches are counted.''

Notes

 
Managers
UE Lleida
Managers